Saturday Roundup is an American Western television program that aired on NBC on Saturday night from June 10, 1951 to September 1, 1951 at 8:00 p.m Eastern Standard Time.

Synopsis
The stories on Saturday Roundup were all adaptations of James Oliver Curwood, and each of them starred Kermit Maynard in a different role each week.

References

1951 American television series debuts
1951 American television series endings
NBC original programming
Black-and-white American television shows